The Swan Coastal Plain Shrublands and Woodlands is a sclerophyll-woodland vegetation community that stretch from Kalbarri in the north to Busselton in the south, passing through Perth, in Western Australia. Situated on the Swan Coastal Plain, it is listed as Endangered under the Commonwealth Environment Protection and Biodiversity Conservation Act 1999. The woodlands also incorporate Perth–Gingin Shrublands and Woodlands.

Geography
The community sits on poorly drained plains with greyish sandy benches and disjunctive swamps, in addition to areas that lie on bog iron ore, marl or solonetz soils, and as well as heavy clay soils.The Perth–Gingin Shrublands and Woodlands are located on inundated ironstone and heavy clay soils. The community occurs at parts near Kalbarri, City of Swan, City of Gosnells, Eneabba, the Perth area, at Gingin and Busselton and in the Scott River area, even though 97% of it is cleared.

Ecology
Native species include shrubs and small trees such as Melaleuca viminea, Grevillea curviloba, Kunzea recurva, Grevillea evanescens, Dryandra sessilis, Acacia saligna, Grevillea curviloba, Jacksonia furcellata, with Rhodanthe spp, being in the understorey, and the herbs Rhodanthe manglesii and Tribonanthes australis. 

Other species in the community include Banksia attenuata, Banksia menziesii, sometimes with Allocasuarina fraseriana with a shrub layer that may include Adenanthos cygnorum, Hibbertia huegelii, Scaevola repens, Allocasuarina humilis, Bossiaea eriocarpa, Hibbertia hypericoides and Stirlingia latifolia. Herbs and forbs include Conostylis aurea, Burchardia congesta and Patersonia occidentalis.

References

Endangered ecological communities
Remnant urban bushland
Vegetation of Australia
Ecoregions of Western Australia
Temperate grasslands, savannas, and shrublands
Sclerophyll forests
Mediterranean forests, woodlands, and scrub